Salisbury Township is the name of some places in the U.S. state of Pennsylvania:

Salisbury Township, Lancaster County, Pennsylvania
Salisbury Township, Lehigh County, Pennsylvania

Pennsylvania township disambiguation pages